Howe is an unincorporated community in Nemaha County, Nebraska, United States. Howe is part of Zip code 68305, Auburn, Nebraska, with the nearest postal facility at Auburn.

Google Maps did not bother to videograph Howe.

History
A post office was established at Howe in 1882, and remained in operation until it was discontinued in 1962. The community was named for Major Church Howe, an American diplomat.

Howe was a station and shipping point on the Missouri Pacific Railroad.

References

Unincorporated communities in Nemaha County, Nebraska
Unincorporated communities in Nebraska